The Tone Rebellion is a science fiction real-time strategy game created by The Logic Factory. Released in 1997, it was the company's second release after Ascendancy, a space strategy game.

Background
The Tone Rebellion is a pseudo-3D real-time strategy game with some RPG and puzzle-solving elements. Similar to Alien Legacy and Maelstrom, there is a plot that runs throughout the game and unfolds with progress. You are leader of the Floaters, jellyfish-like aliens who fight to release the Tone, the life energy of the Floater world, from the grip of a force of evil called the Leviathan.

The game employs the theme of realms that determine the form and power of creatures that initiate from those realms.  These realms have effects on both the Floaters and the Leviathan.

The Tone Rebellion also plays upon a strong "good versus evil" theme: the Floaters are pure, innocent and yet fighting for good, while the Leviathan represents an evil with no conscience, overcome by greed and hatred.  "Leviathan" itself is a Biblical reference to a large, powerful sea creature. Long ago, when the Leviathan first attacked the peaceful Floaters, there was one large island and one kind of Floaters. During the attack, the island split into many smaller islands. The four surviving Floater tribes were stuck on islands far from each other, with each tribe believing no one else survived. Over time, the tribes began to develop differently from each other. Their goal, however, is to defeat the Leviathan and restore the flow of the "good" Tone, recreating the original island.

Gameplay
Similar to other 4X games, The Tone Rebellion offers different races (called tribes in the game) for you to control. Each tribe differs from the others in its abilities, the structures it can build, and the type of spells it can cast. There are only four clans to choose from, although they are unique enough that replaying the game as a different clan produces a different playing experience.  The difficulty of the Leviathan is adjustable on a 1 to 5 scale at the start of the game.  Lastly, the number of islands in the game can be pre-chosen, producing a longer or shorter gameplay.

The game starts out on the chosen tribe's home island, with a few worker Floaters and a tribal center.  From there, the civilization of the Floaters must be rebuilt while fighting against the Leviathan enemy. The player must also solve the mysteries of defeating the Leviathan: each world contains specific mysteries that must be solved in order to bridge the gap to new islands or discover how the land has come to its current state. As the player discovers new islands and builds more structures and defenses, the Leviathan becomes more aware of the rebellion, and sends more and stronger armies in an attempt to defeat you. Battles take place in real-time.

Although a complete single player game, The Tone Rebellion offers multiplayer support for up to four players over the Internet or via IPX network connection.

Realms
Four different realms control the struggles between living things: the Physical, the Supernatural, the Ethereal, and the Natural.  Each realm influences both the Floater races and the forms of the Leviathan.  The Physical is the opposite of the Ethereal, and the Supernatural is the opposite of the Natural.  The balance of realms shifts over time, so that the awareness of Floaters may be stronger in different realms as the game progresses.

Importantly, there is a rock, paper, scissors-like hierarchy of dominance between the realms:
 Physical dominates Supernatural
 Supernatural dominates Ethereal
 Ethereal dominates Natural
 Natural dominates Physical
This hierarchy follows a clockwise rotation along the realm-tide meter that is provided in the controls.

Tribes
There are four tribes to choose from, each possessing unique defense units and magic spells.  Each is associated with a particular color, and always starts off its own home island.  The majority of each tribe is associated with one of the realms, except for one set of fighting units, or dojo, which will belong to the next clockwise realm.

 Tarks
 Color: Red
 Home island: Tarzus
 Realm: Physical
 Zygons
 Color: Yellow
 Home island: The Crystal Cave
 Realm: Supernatural
 Cepheans
 Color: Blue
 Home island: The Cephean Sea
 Realm: Ethereal
 Dyla
 Color: Green
 Home island: Pangir
 Realm: Natural

Leviathan
The Leviathan produces both immobile structures and mobile creatures as it expands and takes over each island in the game.  Immobile structures are built on tone nodes and pools, which are initiated via spores.  Once spores land on a location, that pool or node becomes infected, turning a grey color and pulsating.

Infected pools produce spawners, enormous buildings responsible for the production of more spores and attack creatures.  Spawner structure is determined by the dominant realms on the particular island:
 Broont Swamp - physical
 Sasp Furnace - supernatural
 Bestial Orb - ethereal
 Maker Tree - natural

Infected tone nodes produce hostile growths and machines, which may be either active or passive.  Passive structures (such as a blind arm) may injure floaters upon direct contact, whereas active structures (such as a Plasid) may shoot projectiles at floaters from a long distance.

As well as spore units, spawners produce attack creatures for fighting against the rebelling floaters.  These, like spawners, often depend on the influence of realms on the location.  A wide variety of different creatures exist, and most have a less fierce and more fierce version; for example, a Nadrack is like a Drack, but has more hit-points and causes more damage.  The chosen level of difficulty often plays a role in the type, severity and number of the creatures that appear.

Development 
In August 1997, shortly before the game's release, The Logic Factory announced they had split with Broderbund and would publish The Tone Rebellion under Virgin Interactive.

Critical reception
Although it doesn't ship with any major bugs, The Tone Rebellion is still plagued with the same weaknesses as its predecessor, most notably weak AI.  Nonetheless, the game's unique premise and several innovations help set it apart from other 4X  games.

References

External links 
 Preview of the game on Broderbund website

1997 video games
4X video games
Real-time strategy video games
Science fiction video games
Virgin Interactive games
Video games developed in the United States
Windows games
Windows-only games